"Burning Down One Side" is a song by English recording artist Robert Plant from his debut solo studio album, Pictures at Eleven (1982). It was the most popular track from the album on album-oriented rock radio in the United States, peaking at No. 3 on the Billboard Top Tracks chart in 1982. Later released as the first single from the album, it only managed to reach No. 64 on the Billboard Hot 100 and No. 73 on the UK Singles Chart. The UK B-side "Far Post" was a moderate AOR (album-oriented rock) radio hit in the US, reaching No. 12 on the Top Tracks chart in January 1983. This song features Genesis' Phil Collins on drums, as do many other songs off this same album. The song plays at 113 BPM in 4/4 time signature.

Track listing
 UK and US 7" Single
A1: "Burning Down One Side" (Plant, Blunt, Woodroffe) – 3:55
B1: "Moonlight in Samosa" (Plant, Blunt) – 3:58

 UK 12" Single
A1: "Burning Down One Side" (Plant, Blunt, Woodroffe) – 3:55
B1: "Moonlight in Samosa" (Plant, Blunt) – 3:58
B2: "Far Post" (Plant, Blunt, Woodroffe) – 4:42

References

External links
 

Robert Plant songs
Songs written by Robert Plant
1982 songs
Songs written by Robbie Blunt
1982 debut singles